Brett V. Harrelson (born June 4, 1963) is an American actor.

Early life
Brett Harrelson was born in Midland, Texas, the son of Diane Lou (née Oswald) and Charles Voyde Harrelson, who divorced in 1964. He has two brothers, Jordan and Woody Harrelson. Harrelson's father, who was a contract killer, was arrested for the killing of Judge John H. Wood Jr. by rifle fire in 1979 in San Antonio. His father was convicted and eventually died during his life sentence in United States Penitentiary Administrative Maximum Facility.

In 1973, Harrelson moved with his mother to her native city, Lebanon, Ohio, where he was raised. Harrelson attended Lebanon High School but dropped-out at 17 to join the United States Army, and spent two years in Germany. Afterward, he returned to Lebanon and worked as a legal clerk.

Career 
At 22, Harrelson followed his brother Woody to California. "I came to L.A. to starify," he says. But finding nothing like Woody's success, he gave up acting for a while to become a motorcycle racer, rising to #8 in the 1992 professional national rankings. "After seeing a few people killed," says Brett, he became Woody's assistant and began to pursue his acting career again.

His current activities include TV ads for "Harrelson's Own CBD
". In 2020, Harrelson co-produced Son of a Hitman, a podcast series. The show was released by Spotify Studios and High Five Content.

Filmography

Film

Television

References

External links

Living people
1963 births
People from Midland, Texas
Male actors from Texas
20th-century American male actors
21st-century American male actors
People from Lebanon, Ohio
Male actors from Ohio
American male film actors